Johnston County is a county located in the U.S. state of North Carolina. As of the 2020 census, the population was 215,999. Its county seat is Smithfield.

Johnston County is included in the Raleigh, NC Metropolitan Statistical Area, which is also included in the Raleigh-Durham-Chapel Hill, NC Combined Statistical Area, which has a population of 1,998,808 as of U.S. Census 2012 Population Estimates.

History
The county was formed in 1746 from Craven County. It was named for Gabriel Johnston, Governor of North Carolina from 1734 to 1752. In 1752 parts of Johnston County, Bladen County, and Granville County were combined to form Orange County. In 1758 the eastern part of Johnston County became Dobbs County. In 1770 parts of Johnston County, Cumberland County, and Orange County were combined to form Wake County. Finally, in 1855 parts of Johnston County, Edgecombe County, Nash County, and Wayne County were combined to form Wilson County.

Most early growers in Johnston County were subsistence farmers. A few grew tobacco as a cash crop or reared pigs and cattle, which were sold in Virginia. Smithfield was the westernmost freight port on the Neuse River, and in 1770 the colonial government erected a tobacco warehouse there to store the crop before it was shipped out. Eli Whitney's cotton gin was introduced in the county in about 1804, leading cotton to become the area's leading cash crop. Production for sale at markets remained low before the 1850s due to poor transportation links with other parts of the state. In 1856 the North Carolina Railroad was completed, connecting Johnston County with major urban areas. As result, farming for sale increased, lumber and turpentine industries developed, and the towns of Princeton, Pine Level, Selma, and Clayton were eventually created. About 1,500 Johnstonian men fought in the American Civil War, of whom about a third died. Lingering political tensions and the emancipation of slaves created social and economic turmoil. The new state constitution of 1868 created the county's first townships, which were altered up until 1913. In 1886 the "Short-Cut" line of the Wilmington and Weldon Railroad was laid through Johnston, eventually giving rise to the towns of Kenly, Micro, Four Oaks, and Benson.

The Panic of 1893 caused cotton prices to sharply decline, leading area farmers to switch to bright leaf tobacco as their primary cash crop. A new tobacco market was established in Smithfield in 1898, and the county's first bank was created. Within several years, cotton mills were erected in Smithfield, Clayton, and Selma. During World War I, a brief surge in tobacco and cotton prices brought a boom to the local economy. As a result, the county embarked on a school-construction campaign and consolidated all public schools under a single county system. In the 1920s the state built the county's first two paved highways, and shortly thereafter many towns began paving their main streets. While local commerce enjoyed significant success during the decade, area farmers struggled due to drops in tobacco and cotton prices. The Wall Street Crash of 1929 and ensuing Great Depression caused all banks in the county close. Following the passage of a state bond issue in 1949, most roads in the county and town streets were paved.

Geography

State and local protected areas 
 Bentonville Battlefield State Historic Site
 Clemmons Educational State Forest (part)
 Flower Hill Nature Preserve (part)
 Howell Woods Environmental Learning Center
 Wild Bills Western Town- Shadowhawk

Major water bodies 
 Black Creek
 Buckhorn Reservoir
 Buffalo Creek
 Holts Lake
 Little Creek
 Little River (Neuse River tributary)
 Middle Creek
 Mingo Swamp (South River tributary)
 Moccasin Creek
 Neuse River
 Sassarixa Swamp
 Snipers Creek
 Swift Creek

Adjacent counties
 Nash County - northeast
 Wilson County - east
 Wayne County - southeast
 Sampson County - south
 Harnett County - southwest
 Wake County - northwest

Major highways

 
  (Concurrency with US 70)
 
 
  (Concurrency with US 264)

Major infrastructure 
 Johnston Regional Airport (JNX/KJNX)
 Selma Union Depot

Demographics

2020 census

As of the 2020 United States census, there were 215,999 people, 73,567 households, and 53,743 families residing in the county.

2000 census
As of the census of 2000, there were 121,965 people, 46,595 households, and 33,688 families residing in the county.  The population density was 154 people per square mile (59/km2). There were 50,196 housing units at an average density of 63 per square mile (24/km2). The racial makeup of the county was 78.09% White, 15.65% Black or African American, 0.41% Native American, 0.30% Asian, 0.04% Pacific Islander, 4.53% from other races, and 0.99% from two or more races.  7.74% of the population were Hispanic or Latino of any race.

There were 46,595 households, out of which 35.40% had children under the age of 18 living with them, 57.80% were married couples living together, 10.60% had a female householder with no husband present, and 27.70% were non-families. 23.10% of all households were made up of individuals, and 8.60% had someone living alone who was 65 years of age or older. The average household size was 2.58 and the average family size was 3.02.

In the county, the population was spread out, with 26.10% under the age of 18, 8.10% from 18 to 24, 34.20% from 25 to 44, 21.70% from 45 to 64, and 9.80% who were 65 years of age or older. The median age was 34 years. For every 100 females there were 98.70 males.  For every 100 females age 18 and over, there were 96.30 males.

The median income for a household in the county was $40,872, and the median income for a family was $48,599. Males had a median income of $33,008 versus $25,582 for females. The per capita income for the county was $18,788. About 8.90% of families and 12.80% of the population were below the poverty line, including 16.00% of those under age 18 and 19.40% of those age 65 or over.

Law and Government
The county is governed by the Johnston County Board of Commissioners, a seven-member board of County Commissioners, elected to serve four-year terms. The commissioners enact policies such as establishment of the property tax rate, regulation of land use and zoning outside municipal jurisdictions, and adoption of the annual budget. Commissioners generally meet each month.

Current (2019) members of the Johnston County Board of Commissioners are:
 Ted G. Godwin, Chairman
 Chad M. Stewart, Vice Chairman
 Jeffrey P. Carver
 Larry Wood
 Tony Braswell
 Patrick E. Harris
 R.S. "Butch" Lawter, Jr.
Rick Hester is the County Manager.

Johnston County is a member of the regional Triangle J Council of Governments. Johnston County 911 is the first 911 Agency in North Carolina to hold "Tri Accreditation" from the National Academies of Emergency Dispatch in Fire, Police, and EMD Protocols.

Politics
For most of the time after the Civil War, Johnston County was a classic Solid South county, going Democratic in all but three elections from 1880 to 1964. However, from 1968 onward it has turned increasingly Republican, with the only breaks in this tradition being its support for third-party candidate George Wallace in 1968 and for Democrat Jimmy Carter in 1976. Carter's unsuccessful bid for reelection in 1980 is the last time that a Democrat has managed even 40 percent of the county's vote.

Education

Higher education
Johnston County is home to Johnston Community College (JCC), a public, two-year, post-secondary college located in Smithfield.  The college has off-campus centers throughout Johnston County.

Primary and secondary education
Public education in Johnston County is served by the Johnston County School District, which has 46 schools and serves more than 35,400 students. In addition, three charter schools and five private schools are located in the county. In 2021, the county school board banned the teaching of critical race theory.

Libraries
The Johnston County Public Affiliated Library system operates six branches throughout the county. The library system keeps books, periodicals and audio books and has recently expanded the selection to include downloadable e-books. The Hocutt-Ellington Memorial Library in Clayton left the Johnston County affiliated library system in 2015.

Culture
The Bentonville Battlefield State Historic Site is the largest Civil War battlefield in North Carolina. The Battle of Bentonville was fought in 1865, and was the only Confederate offensive targeted to stop General Sherman's march through the South.

The Tobacco Farm Life Museum in Kenly has been collecting artifacts and showcasing the heritage of the Eastern North Carolina farmer for over 35 years. The site includes a museum and restored farmstead, blacksmith shop, and one-room school house.

The Ava Gardner Museum, located in Smithfield, contains a collection of artifacts such as scripts, movie posters, costumes and personal belongings of actress Ava Gardner, who was born and raised in Johnston County. The museum holds an annual festival.

The Johnston County Heritage Centers in Smithfield contains county artifacts and genealogical records.

The Johnston County Arts Council promotes arts in the county and its schools. Smithfield is the location of an annual Ava Gardner Festival, which celebrates the life of the actress.

The Meadow community is the location of Meadow Lights, an annual display of Christmas lights.

Media

Radio and Television

Johnston County is located in the Raleigh-Durham radio market, ranked by Nielsen as the 37th largest in the United States. Johnston County's first radio station, WMPM, 1270 AM, in Smithfield, signed on in 1950. The county is also home to WPYB, 1130 AM in Benson, WHPY, 1590 AM in Clayton, WTSB, 1090 AM in Selma, and WKJO, 102.3 FM in Smithfield.

The county is also part of the larger, 23-county Raleigh-Durham-Fayetteville Media marketDesignated Market Area—the nation's 24th-largest. WNGT-CD, (virtual channel 34.1) a Class A low-powered TV station licensed to both Smithfield and Selma. The station began frequency sharing with Raleigh's WRAL-TV in November 2020, greatly expanding its coverage. Goldsboro-licensed CBS affiliate WNCN, virtual channel 17/RF channel 8, originally known as WYED-TV, signed on from studios and a transmitter in Clayton in 1988 before moving to Raleigh studios in 1995.

Newspapers

 Clayton News-Star
 Kenly News
 Four Oaks-Benson News in Review
 Princeton News Leader
 The Selma News
 Pine Level News
 Johnstonian News
 The Daily Record
 The Smithfield Herald
 The Cleveland Post
 The Garner-Cleveland Record
 The News & Observer

Communities

Towns

 Archer Lodge
 Benson
 Clayton (largest town)
 Four Oaks
 Kenly
 Micro
 Pine Level
 Princeton
 Selma
 Smithfield (county seat)
 Wilson's Mills

Townships

 Banner
 Bentonville
 Beulah
 Boon Hill
 Brogden
 Clayton
 Cleveland
 Elevation
 Ingrams
 Meadow
 Micro
 O'Neals
 Pine Level
 Pleasant Grove
 Selma
 Smithfield
 Wilders
 Wilson Mills

Unincorporated communities

 Allens Crossroads
 Bagley
 Blackmans Crossroads
 Cleveland
 Emit
 Flowers
 Grabtown
 Hocutts Crossroads
 Jordan
 McGee Crossroads
 Peacocks Crossroads
 Powhatan
 Spilona
 Stancils Chapel
 West Smithfield
 Willow Spring (part)

See also
 List of counties in North Carolina
 National Register of Historic Places listings in Johnston County, North Carolina
 List of places named after people in the United States
 Johnston United Soccer Association
 North Carolina in the American Civil War
 List of North Carolina state forests
 List of future Interstate Highways

References

Works cited

Further reading

External links

 
 
 Johnston County Visitors Bureau
 Johnston County Heritage Center - site which includes historical photos, online tours and exhibits, timelines, and facts

 
North Carolina counties
Johnston County
Johnston County, North Carolina
Johnston County